Municipal amalgamation is one of five forms of municipal restructuring in the Province of Alberta. Under current legislation, the authority to amalgamate two or more municipalities is provided under Division 5 of the Municipal Government Act.

The first amalgamation in Alberta involving one or more urban municipalities occurred on February 1, 1912, when the cities of Strathcona and Edmonton merged to form a single municipal government under the name of the City of Edmonton. The most recent amalgamation occurred on August 1, 2007, when the Town of Lac La Biche merged with Lakeland County to form a municipal district named Lac La Biche County. The next amalgamation will occur on January 1, 2023, when the towns of Turner Valley and Black Diamond will merge into the newly created town of Diamond Valley.

List of urban municipality amalgamations 
The following is a chronological list of historic municipal amalgamations in Alberta involving at least one or more urban municipalities.

Amalgamation proposals

Black Diamond and Turner Valley 
The thought of amalgamating the towns of Black Diamond and Turner Valley first surfaced in the mid-1980s. Turner Valley withdrew from the discussions after Alberta Municipal Affairs completed a feasibility report on the amalgamation in 1986.

The possibility resurfaced in 2006 when the towns initiated discussions on a possible amalgamation of the two municipalities. The discussions culminated in a plebiscite held on October 15, 2007, concurrently with their municipal elections, where the question asked of voters was "Do you support an amalgamation of the Town of Black Diamond and the Town of Turner Valley to form one municipality?" The results of the plebiscite were 66% of Turner Valley voters were in favour of amalgamation, while 71% of Black Diamond voters were against amalgamation.

A third amalgamation investigation began in early 2016 through a joint request of Black Diamond and Turner Valley for a provincial grant to undertake a feasibility study. Following negotiations and engagement, the two town councils will decided on amalgamation in September 2021 with the proposed name of the amalgamated municipality is the Town of Diamond Valley. The government of Alberta approved the merger in May 2022 and the towns will officially amalgamate on January 1, 2023. On November 28, 2022 both towns voted for their new town's first mayor and council with Turner Valley's current mayor Barry Crane being elected Diamond Valley's first mayor.

Edmonton, St. Albert and Strathcona County 
The City of Edmonton applied for a significant annexation in early 1979 that included large portions of Parkland County and Sturgeon County as well as the entireties of City of St. Albert and Strathcona County, which included the unincorporated hamlet of Sherwood Park. The annexation would have effectively amalgamated St. Albert and Strathcona County with Edmonton. Alberta's Local Authorities Board (LAB), a predecessor to the Municipal Government Board, granted the annexation in 1980 but excluded St. Albert, Sherwood Park and lands in Strathcona County to the east of Sherwood Park, thereby preventing any form of amalgamation. The lesser annexation granted by the LAB was subsequently tossed out by Alberta's provincial cabinet.

Entwistle and Evansburg 
The former villages of Entwistle and Evansburg investigated amalgamation in 1986. The two villages subsequently dissolved into hamlets under the jurisdictions of Parkland County and Yellowhead County respectively.

Medicine Hat and Redcliff 
The amalgamation of the Town of Redcliff with the neighbouring City of Medicine Hat was investigated or considered to various degrees in 1962, 1968, 1972, 1979, 1980, and 1985.

Spruce Grove and Stony Plain 
Amalgamation of the towns of Spruce Grove and Stony Plain was investigated in the mid-1980s after Stony Plain had incurred a high debt. Despite a recommendation in favour of amalgamation from Alberta Municipal Affairs, residents of Spruce Grove were not supportive of the amalgamation as it would have resulted in a significant increase in their property taxes.

The City of Spruce Grove initiated a growth study in 2014 in which expansion via amalgamation was to be explored as an alternative to annexation. Potential partners for the amalgamation included the Town of Stony Plain, Parkland County or both.

See also 
2000–06 municipal reorganization in Quebec
2002–2006 municipal reorganization of Montreal
Amalgamation of the Halifax Regional Municipality
Amalgamation of Toronto
Amalgamation of Winnipeg
Edmonton annexations
List of communities in Alberta
List of former urban municipalities in Alberta
List of municipal amalgamations in New Brunswick
List of municipalities in Alberta
Manitoba municipal amalgamations, 2015

References 

 
History of Alberta
 
Municipal amalgamations